The Comte AC-4 Gentleman was a 1920s Swiss two-seat sport/training aircraft produced by Flugzeugbau A. Comte.

Design and development
In 1927 the Swiss company Flugzeugbau A. Comte designed and built a prototype two-seat cabin monoplane designated the AC-4 Gentleman. It was a braced high-wing monoplane with fixed tailwheel landing gear. It had staggered seats for two with an option for dual controls.

Variants
AC-4
Production version with a 115 hp (86 kW) Cirrus Hermes inline piston engine.
AC-4B
Second production batch with 140 hp (104 kW) Armstrong Siddeley Genet Major or 110 hp (82 kW) Cirrus Hermes, five built.

Operators

Swiss Air Force

Specifications (AC-4)

See also

References

External links

Photos at airliners.net

Swiss civil aircraft
AC-4
Single-engined tractor aircraft
Aircraft first flown in 1927